Daniel Alexander Mintz (born September 25, 1981) is an American actor, comedian, and writer best known for his role as Bob's oldest daughter Tina Belcher on the animated show Bob's Burgers. As a comedian, he is known for his extremely deadpan delivery, keeping his eyes fixed straight ahead and never looking toward the camera or audience due to natural stage fright.

Early life and education
Born to a Jewish family, Mintz grew up in Anchorage, Alaska. He is a graduate of Harvard University, where he wrote for The Harvard Lampoon.

Career
He landed his first writing job at Comedy Central's Crank Yankers, then worked on Last Call with Carson Daly. He has written for The Andy Milonakis Show, Human Giant, Lucky Louie, Important Things with Demetri Martin, Jon Benjamin Has a Van, Nick Swardson's Pretend Time, Nathan For You, The Awesomes and Mulaney. His writing credits also include the Bob's Burgers episode titled "The Equestranauts".

On May 16, 2007, Mintz appeared on Late Night with Conan O'Brien. His standup appeared on the compilation CD Comedy Death-Ray, and a special for Comedy Central Presents aired on March 28, 2008. In February 2013, he performed standup on Late Show With David Letterman. He recorded a standup album, The Stranger, at Comedy Works in Denver in July 2013. The album was released in 2014 through Comedy Central Records.

Personal life
Mintz resides in Los Angeles, California. Mintz married fellow comedian Margie Kment on May 29, 2011. They have two children.

Filmography

Film

Television

Writer

References

External links
 
 Dan Mintz at Comedy Central
 

1981 births
21st-century American comedians
American male voice actors
American stand-up comedians
Comedians from Alaska
Harvard University alumni
Jewish American male comedians
Jewish American male actors
Living people
Male actors from Anchorage, Alaska
Writers from Anchorage, Alaska
21st-century American Jews
The Harvard Lampoon alumni